Fasham ( is a city in, and the capital of, Rudbar-e Qasran District of Shemiranat County, Tehran province, Iran. At the 2006 census, its population was 6,895 in 2,019 households. The following census in 2011 counted 7,994 people in 2,509 households. The latest census in 2016 showed a population of 6,945 people in 2,294 households.

References 

Shemiranat County

Cities in Tehran Province

Populated places in Tehran Province

Populated places in Shemiranat County